Azerbaijani folklore (Azerbaijani: Azərbaycan folkloru) is the folk tradition of Azerbaijani people which has developed throughout the centuries. Azerbaijani folklore is embodied explicitly in a large collection of narratives and implicitly in representational arts, such as vase painting and votive gifts.

Sources of Azerbaijani folklore

National Azerbaijani folklore samples followed by eposes such as Kitabi-Dede Gorgud, Gurbani, Koroglu, Shah Ismayil, Abbas and Gulgaz and Asli and Kerem, tales, bayatys, holavars, lullabies, anecdotes, riddles, proverbs and aphorisms. Azerbaijani myths are mainly based on the heroism and wisdom of a human being, which is demonstrated in epics such as Epic of Köroğlu, Book of Dede Korkut and Əsli və Kərəm.

Koroǧlu
The story of Koroǧlu (lit. 'son of the blind') begins with his father's loss of sight. The feudal lord Hasan Khan blinds his stable manager Ali Kişi for a trivial offense by plucking out his eyes. . Köroǧlu character is supported by several historical pieces of evidence. In the late 16th century, the historical Koroǧlu was a leader of jelali rebellion, which broke out in Azerbaijan, in the border area between Persia and Turkey. Regarding the Turkish scholar, Pertev Naili Boratav, the Turkish sultan ordered to catch the leader of jelali called Köroǧlu (Rushan by name) during the 1580s.

Book of Dede Korkut 
The character of Korkut is a white-bearded old man who is the narrative of the tale and guardian of the epic tradition. The book of Dede Korkut is known to the modern world from the two manuscripts belonging to the late 16th century.

Baba-I Amir 
Baba-I Amir was a comic character in Azerbaijani folklore.

Bayati 
“Bayati” is a short and ancient Azeri folk poetry containing four lines with seven syllable in each. They represent human feelings in a poetic form. Several forms of this genre differ from one another according to their telling form and subject. For instance, bayati-baglama, bayati deyishme (competition in saying bayati), vesfi-hal (praising), petting, holavar (labor poems). In these verses, ancient medical cures are mostly emphasized such as water-mint, spearmint, chamomile and basil that used as a treatment.

Ashik poetry 
Ashik poetry is known as an ancient folk poetic performance in Caucasus. Poet-singers called ashiks narrated ancient tales and legends with stringed instrument kobuz in Azerbaijan. This way folk tales such as Köroǧlu and The Book of Dede Korkut preserved until today. Köroǧlu heroic dastan is the most famous Azerbaijani ashik epic and narrated by the third person, who is an ashik himself. Basic story spread from the origin place where supposed Anatolia or Azerbaijan into Turkmenistan, Uzbekistan, Tajikistan by changing its content and character at every stage. In the Middle East ashiks regarded as a poet, singer, composer or musician. In Azerbaijani, the meaning of ashik is the lover of nature and life and accepted as a creator of national folk music and poetry.

Ceremonial songs and dances 
Natural forces were the main subject for the national folklore samples in Azerbaijani folklore and people tried to express them by words or movements. The most popular ceremonial songs and dances were Kosa-Kosa, Godu-Godu, Novruz and Xidir Nabi which show dramatic genres of Azeri folklore.

Supernatural beings
Meshe Adam, sometimes known as Ağac Kişi (literally 'tree man') is according to Azerbaijani and Karachay mythology a spirit, who lives in mountainous forests. It often represented in the form of hairy creatures of both sexes, being an ape with a human face and a sharp odor. It was believed that during their search for food, they go undercover to the gardens and orchards during the night while wearing discarded human clothes. According to some researchers, the Meshe Adam is a variant of the legend of the yeti. «Forest Man» is a common folklore figure for Caucasus region. In the article, “Forest Man” by W. Feuerstein close connection has been observed between the forest folk and the traditions of the sovereign of the game in the Caucasus. This connection displays itself beyond the boundaries of Caucasus like Scandinavian Skogsrå and a tricky Russian wood-sprite Leshy. 
Qulyabani (borrowed from Persian: غول‌بیابانی Ghul-e Biābānī meaning 'the monster of the desert') is an evil spirit, who lives in the desert and cemeteries. According to Azerbaijani and Turkish researchers, Gulyabani's main occupation was scaring night travelers, while they had features of a werewolf at night. They also love riding horses, while mixing horses mane. According to the legend, Gulyabani will work for humans, if someone can penetrate with needle their collar. But at the same time they will serve all the orders of the master as vice versa. In the western regions of Azerbaijan, Gulyabani often identified as a malicious spirit of water Ardov.
Tepegoz is an Azerbaijani mythical creature similar to the cyclops Polyphemus.

Relations with other cultures 
Azerbaijani folklore derives elements from Persian mythology & Turkic mythology.

Developing activities 
Regarding the UNESCO Convention of 20 October 2005, “On the Protection and Promotion of the Diversity of Cultural Expression” a number of activities have been carried out in the regions of Azerbaijan in order to promote the folklore, culture, and art of ethnic groups. Azerbaijan joined the convention in 2009. Azerbaijan Ministry of Culture and Tourism organizes a festival called “Azerbaijan, the native land” dedicated to the national minorities back in 2006. Within the framework of the festival, various ethnic minorities attend for presenting their folklore. Internationally broadcasting festival hosts approximately 500 participants from all ethnic regions of Azerbaijan. The festival is presented in English, too. There about 41 music and art schools for children in the regions where ethnic groups are populated. In those schools, folklore and ethnic culture are taught.

Folklore institute 
Azerbaijan folklore institute was established in 1994 on the basis of the Literature Institute named after Nizami Azerbaijan National Academy of Sciences (ANAS). Although it has started its activity as an independent structural unit of ANAS in 2003, in the early years of the establishment of Cultural Center it acted as a division of the center.

In 2012, the Department of Folklore and Ethnic Minorities, which is responsible for the collection of folklore samples, was launched in the Folklore Institute of Azerbaijan. The main goal of the department is to arrange the preservation and research of the assembled folklore samples.

Publications and research 
There are many books and articles in Persian such as, “Azerbayjan Folklorunden Numunahlar” by Hidayat Hasari and “Folklor Ganjinahsi, Oyunlar” by Zahareh Vafasi have been written about the Azerbaijani folklore, which cover various aspects of the country folklore. Samad Behrangi is a writer who was born in Tabriz in 1939 has written children's stories about Azerbaijani folklore. Yagub Khoshgabani and his wife collected and studied Azerbaijani folklore by travelling and taping folklore records in accordance with the statements of elders.

See also 
 Azerbaijani literature
 Azerbaijani fairy tales
 Turkic mythology
 Persian mythology

References

 
Azerbaijani culture
Azerbaijani mythology
Turkic mythology
Persian mythology